Dastangoi (Urdu: داستان گوئی) is a 13th century Urdu oral storytelling art form.

The Persian style of dastan evolved in 16th century.
One of the earliest references in print to dastangoi is a 19th-century text containing 46 volumes of the adventures of Amir Hamza titled Dastan e Amir Hamza.

The art form reached its zenith in the Indian sub-continent in the 19th century and is said to have died with the demise of Mir Baqar Ali in 1928. Dastangoi was revived by historian, author and director Mahmood Farooqui in 2005.Syed Sahil Agha has amalgamated Dastangoi with music & singing in 2010.

At the centre of dastangoi is the dastango, or storyteller, whose voice is his main artistic tool in orally recreating the dastan or the story. Notable 19th-century dastangos included Amba Prasad Rasa, Mir Ahmad Ali Rampuri, Muhammad Amir Khan, Syed Husain Jah, and Ghulam Raza.

Etymology 
Dastangoi has its origin in the Persian language. Dastan means a tale; the suffix -goi makes the word mean "to tell a tale".

History
Indian urban anthropologist Ghaus Ansari ascribed the origin of dastangoi to Pre-Islamic Arabia, and detailed how the eastward spread of Islam carried dastangoi to Iran and then to Delhi in India.  From Delhi, dastangoi made its way to Lucknow in the 18th century, aided by the Indian Rebellion of 1857, during which several artists, writers and dastangos moved from Delhi to Lucknow.

In Lucknow, dastangoi was popular across all classes, and was regularly performed at diverse locations including chowks (city squares), private households, and afeem khana (public opium houses). "It became so popular among opium addicts that they made listening to stories an important element of their gatherings," wrote Ansari. "The prolonged intoxication and prolonged stories narrated by professional story-tellers was mostly combined. Each afeem khana had its own story-teller to entertain the clients; whereas, among the rich, every household used to appoint a dastango as a member of its staff." According to Abdul Halim Sharar, the noted author and historian of nineteenth century Lucknow, the Art of dastangoi, was divided under the following headings:"War", "Pleasure, "Beauty", "Love" and "Deception".

The early dastango's told tales of magic, war and adventure, and borrowed freely from other stories such as the Arabian Nights, storytellers such as Rumi, and storytelling traditions such as the Panchatantra. From the 14th century, Persian dastangois started focusing on the life and adventures of Amir Hamza, the paternal uncle of the Islamic prophet Muhammad. The Indian stream of dastangoi added storytelling elements such as aiyyari (trickery) to these tales.

List of early Urdu Dastans
 Sab Ras - Mulla Wajhi
 Nau tarz-i murassa‘ - Husain ‘Atā Khān Tahsīn
 Nau ā'īn-i hindī (Qissa-i Malik Mahmūd Gīti-Afroz) - Mihr Chand Khatrī
 Jazb-i ‘ishq - Shāh Husain Haqīqat
 Nau tarz-i murassa‘ - Muhammad Hādī a.k.a. Mirzā Mughal Ghāfil
 Ārā'ish-i mahfil (Qissa-i Hātim Tā'ī) - Haidar Bakhsh Haidarī
 Bāgh o bahār (Qissa-i chahār darwesh) - Mīr Amman
 Dāstān-i Amīr Hamza - Khalīl ‘Alī Khān Ashk
 Fasana e Ajaib - Rajab Ali Baig Suroor
 Deval Devi-Khizr Khan - (Romantic dastan of a Vaghela princess and Delhi's Khalji king) - Amir Khusrau
 Khamsa (Khamsa-e-Khusrau) five classical romances dastan: Hasht-Bihisht, Matlaul-Anwar, Khosrow and Shirin, Layla and Majnun and Aaina-Sikandari. - Amir Khusrow

Dastangoi in print

Fort William College in Kolkata published an Urdu version of the dastaan of Amir Hamza in the beginning of the 19th century.   Munshi Nawal Kishore, a publisher in Lucknow, began publishing the dastaans by the 1850s. A few publications were also done in Persian.
 In 1881, Nawal Kishore commissioned the print edition of the entire Hamza dastaan from three dastangos, Mohammed Husain Jah, Ahmed Husain Qamar, and Sheikh Tasadduq Husain. Over a period of twenty five years, the trio produced a collection of 46 volumes. Each volume could be read individually or as a part of the complete work.
 Dastan-e-Hind, is a collection of dastans and Indian folklore, has been performed by many artists around the globe, by Syed Sahil Agha. 2010.
Toh Hazireen Hua Yun... Dastan-e-Ankit Chadha - A collection of dastans woven, by Ankit Chadha. 2019.
Dastangoi-2 is a sequel to earlier book. It contains the collection of modern dastans written and adapted, by Mahmood Farooqui. 2019.

See also
Dastan
List of Urdu prose dastans

References

External links
 
 
 

Spoken word
Storytelling
Urdu-language culture